Bolles House may refer to:

House at 7144 Madrid Avenue, Jacksonville, Florida, also known as the Bolles House, NRHP-listed
Erastus Bolles House, Afton, Minnesota, listed on the NRHP in Washington County, Minnesota
Charles Bolles House, Belle Fourche, South Dakota, National Register of Historic Places listings in Butte County, South Dakota